Gușoeni is a commune located in Vâlcea County, Oltenia, Romania. It is composed of six villages: Burdălești, Dealu Mare, Gușoeni, Gușoianca, Măgureni and Spârleni.

References

Communes in Vâlcea County
Localities in Oltenia